Felipe Díaz Sandino (1891–1960) was a Spanish aviator and Air Force Officer from Catalonia who fought in the Spanish Civil War. He supported the Republic during the Army Coup attempt in July 1936, and was Minister of Defense of Catalonia between July and December 1936.

Works

From conspiracy to revolution, 1929 - 1937 (published in 1990 ).

1891 births
1960 deaths
Unión Militar Republicana Antifascista members
Spanish aviators